Amere Lattin (born July 12, 1997) is an American track and field athlete who specializes in the hurdles, mostly 400-meter hurdles. He was the silver medalist at the 2019 Pan American Games, running 48.98 in the 400 m hurdles final.

He made his international debut in age category competitions: he was a 110-meter hurdles finalist at 2014 Summer Youth Olympics and finished as runner-up in the 110 m hurdles at the 2016 IAAF World U20 Championships. He has also competed in sprinting, sharing in the 4 × 400-meter relay silver medal with the American team at the 2017 Summer Universiade.

He finished third at 2019 USA Championships and qualified for 2019 World Championships in Doha, with a personal best of 48.66.

Running for the University of Houston he ran the first leg on what is recognized as the world record in the 4 × 400 meters relay, the team running a time of 3:01.51.

Statistics
Information from World Athletics profile or Track & Field Results Reporting System unless otherwise noted.

Personal bests
 = wind-assisted (more than +2.0 m/s wind)
 = world record (recognized by World Athletics)

Seasonal bests

International competitions

Notes

References

External links

Living people
1997 births
American male hurdlers
American male sprinters
Pan American Games track and field athletes for the United States
Pan American Games silver medalists for the United States
Pan American Games medalists in athletics (track and field)
Athletes (track and field) at the 2019 Pan American Games
Athletes (track and field) at the 2014 Summer Youth Olympics
World Athletics indoor record holders (relay)
Universiade medalists in athletics (track and field)
Universiade silver medalists for the United States
Medalists at the 2017 Summer Universiade
Medalists at the 2019 Pan American Games
Houston Cougars men's track and field athletes